The women's 100 metres sprint event at the 1936 Olympic Games took place between August 3 and August 4. The final was won by American Helen Stephens. Some journalists suggested she might be a man. However, the International Olympic Committee performed a physical check on Stephens and concluded that she was a woman.

Results

Heats

Heat 1

Heat 2

Heat 3

Heat 4

Heat 5

Heat 6

Semifinals

Semifinal 1

Semifinal 2

Final

References

Athletics at the 1936 Summer Olympics
100 metres at the Olympics
1936 in women's athletics
Ath